The Barnert Memorial Temple is a Reform Jewish synagogue in Franklin Lakes, New Jersey. It houses the Congregation B'nai Jeshurun (Children of the Upright) which was founded in Paterson, New Jersey in 1847.  In 1987, the Congregation moved to a new temple building in Franklin Lakes, NJ. The name "Barnert Memorial Temple" originally referred to its landmark building at Broadway and Straight Street in Paterson.  It was named for Miriam Barnert, the wife of Nathan Barnert, a local real estate developer and Mayor of Paterson, who donated the building as a memorial to her.  The Paterson building was deconsecrated and converted into a warehouse in 1970.

References

External links

Reform synagogues in New Jersey